Maira Alexandra Rodríguez Herrera (born November 24, 1991 in Maracay) is a Venezuelan model and beauty pageant titleholder. She represented Amazonas state at Miss Venezuela 2014 pageant. At the conclusion of the pageant, she won the Miss Earth Venezuela crown, obtaining the right to represent Venezuela in the Miss Earth 2015 pageant. After Stephanie de Zorzi was declared as not the official representative for Miss Earth 2014 because of weight issues, Maira, who is next line, replaced de Zorzi to compete.

As Miss Earth 2014 had concluded, Maira was declared as Miss Earth - Water, making Venezuela as the most victorious in winning the said title with her being the fourth winner.

Biography

Early life and career beginnings
Maira is a young Venezuelan model who was born in Maracay, a city in the state of Aragua in Venezuela. She holds a degree in Public Relations and swimmer since age of five. She has extensive experience in the modeling world, performing both magazines and campaigns in Venezuela and other nations like Panama.

Pageantry

Miss Venezuela World
Maira first joined in the Miss Venezuela World 2013 pageant. She represented the Distrito Capital state. However, she did not place in the pageant. The pageant was won by Karen Soto.

Miss Venezuela 2014
Maira participated in the "Miss Aragua" where she was selected among the representatives of the state toward the Miss Venezuela.

Maira represented the state of Amazonas in Miss Venezuela 2014 where she competed with 24 other candidates from different parts of the country. Rodriguez won the Miss Venezuela Earth crown and would be the representative of Venezuela in Miss Earth 2014.

During the "Gala Interactiva de la Belleza" event, she got the "Miss Confianza (Miss Confidence)" award. During the finals night, Maira was given the "Miss Elegancia (Miss Elegance)" award.

References

External links
Maira at Miss Earth official website
Miss Venezuela Official Website

1991 births
Living people
Venezuelan beauty pageant winners
Miss Earth 2014 contestants
People from Maracay